Kathavarayan may refer to:
 Kathavarayan (1958 film)
 Kathavarayan (2008 film)